Imeon may refer to:

 Mount Imeon, Asia (historical place name)
 Imeon Range, Antarctica

See also
 Imeong, a village in the free state of Palau